Furug Qodirov is a Tajikistani footballer who plays as a defender for CSKA Pomir Dushanbe.

Career statistics

International

Statistics accurate as of match played 23 July 2011

References

External links
 

1992 births
Living people
Tajikistani footballers
Tajikistan international footballers
Association football defenders
Place of birth missing (living people)
Tajikistan youth international footballers